In knot theory, a branch of mathematics, the trefoil knot is the simplest example of a nontrivial knot. The trefoil can be obtained by joining together the two loose ends of a common overhand knot, resulting in a knotted loop. As the simplest knot, the trefoil is fundamental to the study of mathematical knot theory.

The trefoil knot is named after the three-leaf clover (or trefoil) plant.

Descriptions 
The trefoil knot can be defined as the curve obtained from the following parametric equations:

The (2,3)-torus knot is also a trefoil knot. The following parametric equations give a (2,3)-torus knot lying on torus :

Any continuous deformation of the curve above is also considered a trefoil knot. Specifically, any curve isotopic to a trefoil knot is also considered to be a trefoil. In addition, the mirror image of a trefoil knot is also considered to be a trefoil. In topology and knot theory, the trefoil is usually defined using a knot diagram instead of an explicit parametric equation.

In algebraic geometry, the trefoil can also be obtained as the intersection in C2 of the unit 3-sphere S3 with the complex plane curve of zeroes of the complex polynomial z2 + w3 (a cuspidal cubic).

If one end of a tape or belt is turned over three times and then pasted to the other, the edge forms a trefoil knot.

Symmetry 
The trefoil knot is chiral, in the sense that a trefoil knot can be distinguished from its own mirror image. The two resulting variants are known as the left-handed trefoil and the right-handed trefoil. It is not possible to deform a left-handed trefoil continuously into a right-handed trefoil, or vice versa. (That is, the two trefoils are not ambient isotopic.)

Though chiral, the trefoil knot is also invertible, meaning that there is no distinction between a counterclockwise-oriented and a clockwise-oriented trefoil. That is, the chirality of a trefoil depends only on the over and under crossings, not the orientation of the curve.

Nontriviality 
The trefoil knot is nontrivial, meaning that it is not possible to "untie" a trefoil knot in three dimensions without cutting it. Mathematically, this means that a trefoil knot is not isotopic to the unknot. In particular, there is no sequence of Reidemeister moves that will untie a trefoil.

Proving this requires the construction of a knot invariant that distinguishes the trefoil from the unknot. The simplest such invariant is tricolorability: the trefoil is tricolorable, but the unknot is not. In addition, virtually every major knot polynomial distinguishes the trefoil from an unknot, as do most other strong knot invariants.

Classification 
In knot theory, the trefoil is the first nontrivial knot, and is the only knot with crossing number three. It is a prime knot, and is listed as 31 in the Alexander-Briggs notation. The Dowker notation for the trefoil is 4 6 2, and the Conway notation is [3].

The trefoil can be described as the (2,3)-torus knot. It is also the knot obtained by closing the braid σ13.

The trefoil is an alternating knot. However, it is not a slice knot, meaning it does not bound a smooth 2-dimensional disk in the 4-dimensional ball; one way to prove this is to note that its signature is not zero. Another proof is that its Alexander polynomial does not satisfy the Fox-Milnor condition.

Then this fiber bundle has the Milnor map  as the fibre bundle projection of the knot complement  to the circle . The fibre is a once-punctured torus. Since the knot complement is also a Seifert fibred with boundary, it has a horizontal incompressible surface—this is also the fiber of the Milnor map. (This assumes the knot has been thickened to become a solid torus Nε(K), and that the interior of this solid torus has been removed to create a compact knot complement .)

Invariants 

The Alexander polynomial of the trefoil knot is

and the Conway polynomial is

The Jones polynomial is

and the Kauffman polynomial of the trefoil is

The HOMFLY polynomial of the trefoil is

The knot group of the trefoil is given by the presentation

or equivalently

This group is isomorphic to the braid group with three strands.

In religion and culture 
As the simplest nontrivial knot, the trefoil is a common motif in iconography and the visual arts. For example, the common form of the triquetra symbol is a trefoil, as are some versions of the Germanic Valknut.

In modern art, the woodcut Knots by M. C. Escher depicts three trefoil knots whose solid forms are twisted in different ways.

See also 

 Pretzel link
 Figure-eight knot (mathematics)
 Triquetra symbol
 Cinquefoil knot
 Gordian Knot

References

External links 
 Wolframalpha: (2,3)-torus knot
 Trefoil knot 3d model